Cephalops obtusinervis is a species of fly in the family Pipunculidae. It is found in the Palearctic.

References

External links
Images representing  Cephalops obtusinervis at BOLD

Pipunculidae
Insects described in 1844
Diptera of Europe
Taxa named by Johan Wilhelm Zetterstedt